William Patrick Scott (1 March 1880 – 1 June 1948) was a Scotland international rugby union player, who played as a Forward.

Rugby Union career

Amateur career

Scott was born in Wishaw, and went to Fettes College.

He played for West of Scotland.

Provincial career

Scott played for Glasgow District. He played in the 1902-03 Inter-City match against Edinburgh District. He match ended in a nil-nil draw.

International career

He was also capped for the British and Irish Lions. He went on the 1903 British Lions tour to South Africa.

He was also selected for the Barbarians.

Administrative career

Scott was president of the Scottish Rugby Union between 1935 and 1935.

Outside of rugby

Scott was a distiller.

References

Sources

 Bath, Richard (ed.) The Scotland Rugby Miscellany (Vision Sports Publishing Ltd, 2007)
 Godwin, Terry. Complete Who's Who of International Rugby (Cassell, 1987)
 Massie, Allan. A Portrait of Scottish Rugby (Polygon, Edinburgh)

1880 births
1948 deaths
Barbarian F.C. players
British & Irish Lions rugby union players from Scotland
Glasgow District (rugby union) players
People educated at Fettes College
Place of death missing
Presidents of the Scottish Rugby Union
Rugby union players from Wishaw
Scotland international rugby union players
Scottish rugby union players
West of Scotland FC players
Rugby union forwards